Neorhizobium huautlense is a Gram negative root nodule bacterium. It forms nitrogen-fixing root nodules on Sesbania herbacea.

References

Further reading
 Whitman, William B., et al., eds. Bergey's manual® of systematic bacteriology. Vol. 5. Springer, 2012.

External links
 
 LPSN

Rhizobiaceae
Bacteria described in 2014